The Holy Cross Church in Hattula, Finland, is the oldest church in the former Tavastia (Häme) province.

Archaeologist and art history professor Markus Hiekkanen has shown that construction of the current brick building spanned the period from 1472 to 1490 and that the building did not date to the 14th century, as previously thought.

Unique for having been built almost entirely of brick rather than stone, the church was a popular pilgrimage destination during the Middle Ages. A grey stone perimeter wall was added in the 16th century. The church contains paintings from the years 1510 through 1922, as well as 40 wooden sculptures dating to the first half of the 14th century. Precious-metal crowns which had formerly belonged to the church were confiscated during the Reformation. The church pulpit, dating to 1550, is the oldest surviving pulpit in Finland. A second pulpit was built in the 17th century. A bell tower next to the church dates to 1813.

The Hattula church is known for its lime paint frescoes done in late Gothic style, likely completed by the same group of artists who later painted the St. Lars church in Lohja.

References

Further reading

External links
 
 Hattula Parish – Holy Cross Church 

Church
Medieval stone churches in Finland
Gothic architecture in Finland
Buildings and structures in Kanta-Häme
Lutheran churches in Finland
Lutheran churches converted from Roman Catholicism
Churches completed in 1490
15th-century churches in Finland